Radio ASK is a Bosnian commercial radio station, broadcasting from Ilidža, near Sarajevo.

The program is currently broadcast at one frequency (Sarajevo ) and the station focuses on contemporary music, talk shows and local news.

Radio Ask was founded on 25 May 1994 (During Bosnian war and Siege of Sarajevo).

Frequencies

 Sarajevo

References

External links 
 Official website 
 Communications Regulatory Agency of Bosnia and Herzegovina

See also 
List of radio stations in Bosnia and Herzegovina

Sarajevo
Radio stations established in 1994
Mass media in Sarajevo
1994 establishments in Bosnia and Herzegovina